Ayushman Desraj Shrestha Joshi is a Nepalese film actor and model.

He is married to Nepalese film actress Priyanka Karki DS Joshi.

Early life
Joshi was born on 17 December 1993 to Bhavendra Man Joshi and financial CEO Raveena Desraj Shrestha. His younger brother, Aashirman, is also a film actor and model.

Career 
He started his career as a VJ from programs "Hollybollywood” and “Global Beats" on Kantipur Television, and debuted as an actor from film Chapali height 2 which was average success. 

Beside this, he has appeared in cameo role in Chakka Panja 2, as lead actor in Katha Kathmandu (2018) and in Changa Chett (2018).

Joshi is the winner of Face of House of Fashion En Vogue 2015, which was held at Hotel Radisson, Nepal.

Personal Life 

Joshi married his long-time girlfriend, fellow Nepalese film actress Priyanka Karki DS Joshi in February 2020. The couple welcomed th their first child, a girl, in September 2021.

References

External links 
 

1993 births
Living people
21st-century Nepalese male actors
Nepalese male models
Actors from Kathmandu